Bella Unión Airport  is an airstrip  northeast of Santa Ana del Yacuma, a town in the Beni Department of Bolivia. The airstrip is next to a bend in the Mamore River.

See also

Transport in Bolivia
List of airports in Bolivia

References

External links 
OpenStreetMap - Bella Unión
OurAirports - Bella Unión
FallingRain - Bella Unión Airport

Airports in Beni Department